The Order of Bohdan Khmelnitsky was a Soviet award named after Bohdan Khmelnytsky, Hetman (leader) of the Ukrainian  Cossack Hetmanate The award was first established on October 10, 1943, by the Presidium of Supreme Soviet of the USSR during World War II. It was the only Red Army award to be written in the Ukrainian language.

The order was discontinued after the dissolution of the Soviet Union. A similar award, the Order of Bohdan Khmelnytsky, was begun on May 3, 1995, by Ukrainian president Leonid Kuchma to commemorate the 50th anniversary of victory in the German-Soviet War.

Description
The General Nikita Khrushchev, the Soviet filmmaker Alexander Dovzhenko, and poet Mykola Bazhan initiated the idea to create this award. The order was created during World War II and was awarded to Soviet Armed Forces personnel and often the members of the Ukrainian Front (coincidentally three of them were reinstated on October 20, 1943) for their exceptional duty in combat operations that led to the liberation of Soviet territory. The Order of Bohdan Khmelnitsky was broken down into three different classes: 1st class, 2nd class and 3rd class. General Alexei Danilov became the first recipient of the 1st class Order of Bogdan Khmelnitsky.

The 1st class medal was awarded to army commanders, especially at the front, for successful direction of combat operations that led to the liberation of a region or town where they were successful in inflicting heavy casualties on the enemy. Altogether 323 people were awarded Order of Bogdan Khmelnitsky 1st class.

Distinguished people who received this order were several future Marshals of the Soviet Union including Sergey Biryuzov, Kirill Moskalenko, Matvei Zakharov and Petr Koshevoi amongst others.

The 2nd class medal was awarded to corps, divisions, brigade or battalion commanders for a breach of a defensive enemy line or a raid into the enemy's rear. 2400 people were awarded Order of Bohdan Khmelnitsky, 2nd class.

The 3rd class medal was awarded to officers, partisan commanders, sergeants, corporals and privates of the Red Army and partisan units for outstanding bravery and resourcefulness leading to a battle victory. 5700 people were awarded Order of Bogdan Khmelnitsky, 3rd class. Most of them were either Red Army soldiers who fought on the Ukrainian Front or Ukrainian partisans.

The Order was discontinued after the dissolution of the Soviet Union. In 1995 Ukraine established a new Order of Bohdan Khmelnytsky to commemorate the 50th anniversary of the end of World War II. Although it has the same name, it is a different medal.

External links
 Order of Bogdan Khmelnitsky
 president.gov.ua - Order of Bohdan Khmelnytskyi

Military awards and decorations of the Soviet Union